Dave Stevens (born January 12, 1966) is an athlete and a 7 time Emmy Award winning sports broadcasting professional. Stevens,  a congenital amputee, is the only athlete ever to play college football or minor league baseball without legs.

Stevens played minor league baseball for the St. Paul Saints in 1996. He was a college athlete at Augsburg College where he played varsity football, baseball and wrestled.

While at Augsburg College, Stevens also traveled to Ireland, Australia and New Zealand to play football for Team USA.  He has been featured on "That's Incredible" (1981) CBS Morning News, The Today Show, Good Morning America, This Week in Baseball, Baseball Tonight, Extra, USA Today, That's Incredible Reunion (2002) Sports Illustrated, Baseball America, The National Enquirer, Star Magazine, People, ESPN's SportsCenter and hundreds of other news and sports periodicals. He also appears in 2 books about his career "Slouching Toward Fargo" by Neal Karlan and "Baseball Graffiti" by Ed Howsam.

At Wickenburg High School (Wickenburg, Arizona), 1980–1984, Stevens was a three-sport athlete playing football, baseball and wrestling. He set three Arizona state records: most takedowns in wrestling, most career baseball walks, and the season record for walks.

He stands 3-foot 2-inches tall and runs using his hands. During his time with the Saints he was proficient at catching fly balls that landed within 25 feet of him. Marty Scott was the Saints manager when Stevens played, "He touched a place in my heart," Scott said. "He's limited physically, but it's not a handicap. I have admiration for what he's accomplished."  Stevens is also one of the few players to ever Pinch Hit for Darryl Strawberry in his professional career. Stevens also started 1 game at 2nd base with the Saints.

Dave has tried out for the Dallas Cowboys, the Cincinnati Reds and the Minnesota Twins. He was also invited to the Olympic Baseball West Regional tryouts in 1983, playing in the outfield with former Major League players Barry Bonds and Oddibie McDowell.  He has also worked out with the Tampa Rays and Minnesota Twins in Florida, taking batting and fielding practice, as well as throwing out the first pitch in 3 games. Dave continues to work out with Minor League baseball teams around the country showing what he can do even after 50 – without legs.

Dave Stevens worked as the Assignment Desk Manager at ESPN then as the Coverage and Content editor. He worked at ESPN for 20 years. He has covered 11 Super Bowls, 3 World Series, 3 NCAA Final Fours, and various other historic sports events.  He's a father of three boys and is a motivational speaker.   Prior to ESPN he worked at KSTP-TV in Minneapolis.

He is currently a reporter for the Disability Channel and interviews some of the biggest names in sports and entertainment history.

He also co-hosts a Celebrity Amputee Golf tournament yearly in the Orlando area that recently celebrated its 10th year.

In 2012 Wickenburg High School renamed their Most Valuable Player award to the "Dave Stevens Hustle Award" in honor of his amazing career at the High School in the 1980s.

In November 2013, Stevens joined the WWAFT Amputee Football Team as a Quarterback and Defensive Lineman. He continued to tour with the team as they took on NFL alumni and raise awareness for our wounded military heroes. Stevens has played in 19 games with the WWAFT team and they are 21–0 vs NFL Competition.

Stevens is also a highly sought after professional motivational speaker and now works for the Dave Clark Foundation.

Dave joined the Disability Dream & Do Foundation in 2016 and helps to put on baseball camps for disabled children all over the country.

See also
 Jim Abbott, a former Major League Baseball pitcher born with only one hand
 Casey Martin, a disabled golfer
 Oscar Pistorius, a runner with no legs

References

External links
 http://articles.nydailynews.com/1996-05-21/sports/18009408_1_mental-retardation-dave-stevens-watermelon
 http://www.tampabay.com/sports/baseball/rays/athlete-born-without-legs-takes-batting-practice-with-tampa-bay-rays/1156652
 http://frontrow.espn.go.com/2011/04/sidelines-stevens-spring-training
 http://articles.nydailynews.com/1996-05-29/sports/18008814_1_darryl-strawberry-new-pal-dave-stevens
 http://articles.orlandosentinel.com/2012-04-17/sports/os-shannon-owens-amputee-golf-0418-20120417_1_amputees-prosthetic-legs-golf-tournament 
 http://newyork.cbslocal.com/2011/04/14/nj-school-hosts-dozens-of-heroic-motivational-speakers/
 http://purpose2play.com/dave-stevens-became-first-person-without-legs-play-college-football-pro-baseball/ 

1966 births
American amputees
American broadcasters
Living people
Parasports competitors
American motivational speakers
ESPN people
Baseball players from Arizona
Augsburg Auggies baseball players
Augsburg Auggies football players
Augsburg Auggies wrestlers
St. Paul Saints players
People with phocomelia
People from Wickenburg, Arizona
Sportspeople from the Phoenix metropolitan area
Players of American football from Arizona